The following are the football (soccer) events of the year 1967 throughout the world.

Events
January 28 – In the Scottish Cup Berwick Rangers F.C. beat Rangers F.C. 1–0 to cause one of the biggest shock results in Scottish Football.
European Cup: Celtic F.C. defeat Inter Milan 2–1 at the Estádio Nacional in Lisbon to become the first British and first non-Mediterranean winners of the trophy.
Copa Libertadores 1967: Won by Racing Club after defeating Nacional on an aggregate score of 2–1.
Third Lanark A.C., one of the founding members of the Scottish Football League are declared bankrupt and the club is liquidated.
September 21 – NAC makes a winning European debut by defeating Malta's Floriana (1–2) in the first round of the Cup Winners Cup, with both Dutch goals scored by Jacques Visschers.
November 19 – Jimmy O'Connor of Shelbourne sets the world record for the fastest ever hat-trick by scoring three goals in 2 minutes 13 seconds in a League of Ireland match against local rivals Bohemians at Dalymount Park, Dublin.

Winners club national championship

Asia
: Al-Oruba

Europe
: (for fuller coverage see 1966-67 in English football)
First Division - Manchester United
Second Division - Coventry City
Third Division - Queens Park Rangers
Fourth Division - Stockport County
FA Cup - Tottenham Hotspur
Football League Cup - Queens Park Rangers
: Saint-Étienne
: Juventus
: Ajax Amsterdam
: (for fuller coverage see 1966-67 in Scottish football)
Division One - Celtic FC
Division Two - Morton
Scottish Cup - Celtic FC
Scottish League Cup - Celtic FC
: Real Madrid
: Beşiktaş J.K.
: Eintracht Braunschweig

North America
: Toluca
 / :
Los Angeles Wolves (USA)
Oakland Clippers (NPSL)

South America
:
Estudiantes - Metropolitano
Independiente - Nacional
 :
Palmeiras - Taça Brasil
Palmeiras - Torneio Roberto Gomes Pedrosa
: Universidad de Chile
: Club Guaraní

International tournaments
 South American Championship in Montevideo, Uruguay (January 17 – February 2, 1967)
 
 
 
1967 British Home Championship (October 22, 1966 – April 15, 1967)

 Pan American Games in Winnipeg, Manitoba, Canada (July 24 – August 3, 1967)
 
 
 

 South Vietnam Independence Cup in Saigon (November 4 – November 14, 1967)

Births

January–April
 January 8 – Torsten Gowitzke, German footballer and manager
 January 9 – Claudio Caniggia, Argentinian international footballer
 January 16 – Ivo Ron, Ecuadorian footballer
 January 18 – Pieter Huistra, Dutch footballer
 February 3 – Aurelio Vidmar, Australian footballer
 February 10 – Rini Coolen, Dutch footballer and manager
 February 18 – Roberto Baggio, Italian international footballer
 February 18 – Marco Boogers, Dutch footballer
 February 22 – Serghei Stroenco, Moldovan international footballer (died 2013)
 February 26 – Kazuyoshi Miura, Japanese footballer
 March 1 – Aron Winter, Dutch international footballer
 March 3 – Jaime Patricio Ramírez, Chilean footballer
 March 12 – Jorge Dely Valdés, Panamanian footballer
 March 26 – Alberto Coyote, Mexican footballer
 April 7 – Bodo Illgner, German international footballer

May–September
 May 11 – Andrés Romero, Chilean footballer
 May 20 – Richard Zambrano, Chilean footballer
 May 21 – Nando, Spanish footballer
 May 25 – Luc Nilis, Belgian footballer
 May 27 – Paul Gascoigne, English footballer
 June 15 – Héctor Vidal Martínez, Paraguayan footballer
 June 22 – Marc van Hintum, Dutch footballer
 June 23 – Pavel Yevteyev, Kazakhstani footballer
 July 7 – Shamsurin Abdul Rahman, Malaysian footballer
 July 19 – Gabriel Favale, Argentine football referee
 August 7 – Jocelyn Angloma, French footballer
 August 10 – Philippe Albert, Belgian footballer
 August 24 – Michael Thomas, English footballer
 September 2 – Andreas Möller, German footballer
 September 5 – Matthias Sammer, German footballer
 September 6 – David Patiño, Mexican footballer
 September 20: Craig Forrest, Canadian footballer
 September 27 – Uche Okechukwu, Nigerian footballer

October–December
 October 11 – Mario Salas, Chilean international footballer
 October 13 – Hernaín Arzú, Honduran international footballer
 October 21 – Paul Ince, English international footballer
 October 24 – Carlos Antonio Muñoz, Ecuadorian footballer (died 1993)
 November 2 – Zvonimir Soldo, Croatian international footballer
 November 18 – Gavin Peacock, English footballer and sportscaster
 November 28 – José del Solar, Peruvian footballer
 December 5 – Bogdan Stelea, Romanian footballer
 December 14 – Palhinha (Jorge Ferreira da Silva), Brazilian international footballer
 December 28 – Paul Foster, Australian footballer

Deaths

April
 April 1 - Jan van Dort, Dutch international footballer (77)
 April 4 – Héctor Scarone, Uruguayan striker, winner of the 1930 FIFA World Cup and all-time topscorer of the Uruguay national football team between 1930 and 2011. (68)

June
 June 6 – Fernando Paternoster, Argentine defender, runner-up of the 1930 FIFA World Cup. (64)

References

 
Association football by year